Sean Michael Newton (born 23 September 1988) is an English professional footballer who is a player/coach for Northern Premier League Premier Division side Ashton United. He has played in the Football League for Chester City and Notts County.

Club career

Early career
Newton was born in Liverpool, Merseyside. A product of the club's youth system, he signed a professional contract with Chester City in May 2007. He made his first-team debut for Chester on 1 January 2008 against Grimsby Town at left-back, after being an unused substitute in previous matches.

Newton spent time on loan with Southport in the early weeks of the 2007–08 season, allowing him to gain first-team experience. This spell included him scoring from a free-kick against Tamworth. After thirteen league and four cup appearances, he returned to Chester City in November 2007.

At the end of February 2008, Newton and teammate Stephen Vaughan joined Droylsden on loan, where he enjoyed regular first-team football for the remainder of the season.

Newton was in the headlines on 24 December 2008, the day after he played in an FA Cup second-round replay against Chesterfield. Newton scored twice for Droylsden in a 2–1 victory to secure a third round tie against Ipswich Town. However, it emerged after the match that Newton was due to serve a one-game suspension on the day after picking up his fifth yellow card of the season on 9 December. Droylsden had been informed of the suspension by the Football Association on 10 December. This meant that Newton was ineligible to play in the game against Chesterfield. The FA investigated the incident with the matter dealt with by an FA Cup committee on 29 December, after which the three clubs involved were informed of the decision, which was that the club were expelled from the competition, after being found guilty of fielding an ineligible player. The club lodged an appeal, which was unsuccessful.

On 17 July 2009, Newton signed for Conference Premier club Barrow. In August 2009, Newton joined Conference North club AFC Telford United on a one-month loan, following a move in the opposite direction by Gareth Jelleyman.

Stockport County
On 22 March 2012, Newton joined Telford's Conference Premier rivals Stockport County on loan until the end of 2011–12. He joined Stockport permanently in May 2012 on a one-year contract for a nominal fee.

At the start of 2012–13, he was second in line for captaincy. Newton's speed and Freekick ability led to him scoring 6 times in his first full season for the Hatters; making him third in the top scorers list for the season. With Joe Connor and James Tunnicliffe being out of the team, Newton became the captain and was in line for the County Player of the Season award.

Lincoln City
On 14 May 2013, Newton signed for Conference Premier club Lincoln City on a two-year contract.

Wrexham
On 14 May 2015, Newton signed for National League club Wrexham, to replace the released Neil Ashton. During 2015–16, he was ever present in the league before signing a new one-year deal in May 2016. Newton was appointed captain by manager Gary Mills ahead of 2016–17, after the departure of Connor Jennings.

York City

On 28 October 2016, Newton was reunited with Mills after joining Wrexham's National League rivals York City on loan until 4 January 2017, with a view to a permanent transfer on a one-and-a-half-year contract. He debuted the following day, starting in a 2–2 home draw with Sutton United. He committed a foul that led to a penalty kick, which was converted in the 89th minute, although Dave Flett of The Press praised Newton's overall performance, saying he "looked experienced in his decision making and possessed quality on the ball". He was suspended for the following match against Eastleigh, but played regularly on his return and was used in a number of positions, including at centre-back, wing-back and up front. Newton filled in as captain for York's 2–0 home win over Worcester City in the FA Trophy first round on 10 December 2016 in Simon Heslop's absence, and Mills considered handing him the armband permanently. However, Heslop retained the armband on his return, in a 0–0 home draw with Torquay United on 17 December 2016.

Newton signed for York permanently on 6 January 2017. On 21 May 2017, he started as York beat Macclesfield Town 3–2 at Wembley Stadium in the 2017 FA Trophy Final. He was voted by supporters as the Clubman of the Year for the 2016–17 season. Newton was appointed as York captain in the summer of 2017.

Newton joined Northern Premier League Premier Division club Buxton on 4 February 2022 on loan for the remainder of the 2021–22 season. He was voted York’s player of the season on 3 occasions (2017, 2019 and 2020).

In January 2023, he joined Ashton United as player / assistant manager.

International career
Newton was capped five times by the England national C team, scoring one goal, from 2009 to 2010.

Career statistics

Honours
AFC Telford United
Conference North play-offs: 2011

York City
FA Trophy: 2016–17

Individual
York City Clubman of the Year: 2016–17, 2018–19

References

External links

Profile at the York City F.C. website

1988 births
Living people
Footballers from Liverpool
English footballers
England semi-pro international footballers
Association football defenders
Chester City F.C. players
Southport F.C. players
Droylsden F.C. players
Barrow A.F.C. players
AFC Telford United players
Stockport County F.C. players
Lincoln City F.C. players
Notts County F.C. players
Wrexham A.F.C. players
York City F.C. players
Buxton F.C. players
English Football League players
National League (English football) players
Northern Premier League players